Mario Fabián Véner Igaña (born 27 May 1964 in Tandil, Argentina) is an Argentine naturalized Chilean former professional footballer who played as a forward for clubs in Chile, Italy and Spain,

After his retirement from football he moved into coaching, and is coach of the inferiors of Deportes Antofagasta of the Primera B in Chile.

Clubs (player)
 Nocci 1989
 Deportes Linares 1990
 Deportes Puerto Montt 1991
 Deportes Antofagasta 1992–1993
 Cádiz 1993–1994
 Deportes Temuco 1994
 Regional Atacama 1995
 Santiago Wanderers 1996–1997
 Deportes Iquique 1998
 Huachipato 1999
 Deportes Concepción 2000

Clubs (coach)
 Deportes Antofagasta  (Inferiors) 2008–present

Honours
 Santiago Wanderers 1996 (Top Scorer Chilean Championship)

External links
 

1964 births
Living people
Argentine footballers
Association football forwards
Argentine football managers
Chilean footballers
Chilean football managers
Deportes Temuco footballers
Santiago Wanderers footballers
Regional Atacama footballers
C.D. Huachipato footballers
Puerto Montt footballers
Deportes Linares footballers
Deportes Iquique footballers
C.D. Antofagasta footballers
Deportes Concepción (Chile) footballers
Naturalized citizens of Chile
Argentine expatriate footballers
Argentine expatriate sportspeople in Chile
Expatriate footballers in Chile
Expatriate football managers in Chile
Argentine expatriate sportspeople in Italy
Expatriate footballers in Italy
Argentine expatriate sportspeople in Spain
Expatriate footballers in Spain
People from Tandil
Sportspeople from Buenos Aires Province
Deportes Antofagasta managers